Slaptinci is a settlement in the Ščavnica Valley in the Municipality of Sveti Jurij ob Ščavnici in northeastern Slovenia. The area is part of the traditional region of Styria and is now included in the Mura Statistical Region.

References

External links
Slaptinci at Geopedia

Populated places in the Municipality of Sveti Jurij ob Ščavnici